Marcela Koblasová (born 15 June 1956) is a Czech athlete. She competed in the women's pentathlon at the 1980 Summer Olympics.

References

1956 births
Living people
Athletes (track and field) at the 1980 Summer Olympics
Czech pentathletes
Olympic athletes of Czechoslovakia
Sportspeople from Plzeň